The Ringmaster is the name of two fictional character appearing in American comic books published by Marvel Comics. The best known Ringmaster in the Marvel Universe is Maynard Tiboldt who debuted in Hulk #3, and is the leader of the Circus of Crime.

Publication history
A villain known as the Ringmaster of Death appeared in Captain America Comics #5 (Aug 1941). This character also appeared much later in flashback in Captain America #112 (April 1969).

The second Ringmaster is Maynard Tiboldt. Since his first appearance in Hulk #3, he has turned up as a somewhat pathetic and luckless opponent for virtually every hero in the Marvel universe, ranging from Spider-Man to Howard the Duck. He is a tall thin man who sports a Fu Manchu moustache and dresses in a green variation on the traditional circus ringmaster costume. Having acquired a hypnosis-wave generator originally created by the Red Skull and mounted said device in his costume's top hat, the Ringmaster's usual scheme is to lead the self-titled "Circus of Crime" into a community and rob the local citizenry as they attend his circus. Nearly every appearance of the Ringmaster ends with him being thrown back into jail, having been defeated by his current foe.

Fictional character biography

Fritz Tiboldt
The Ringmaster is a Nazi agent, whose circus was a cover for murdering US government officials. He traveled with midget Tommy Thumb; snake charmer Omar; strongman Zandow and the Trapeze Trio. After murdering a U.S. sergeant with a tiger, Captain America and Bucky become suspicious of their activities. The Ringmaster kidnaps Betsy Ross and the heroes trace him and his circus and defeat the foes.

Later on Fritz, along with his wife, were killed by the Nazis for their defeat at the hands of Captain America. Following the introduction of Maynard Tiboldt, this character was revealed to be the later Ringmaster's father.

Maynard Tiboldt
Maynard Tiboldt was born in Vienna, Austria to the original Ringmaster of Death Fritz Tiboldt, and his wife Lola. He inherited the Circus when his parents were murdered.

The Ringmaster is a powerless man with a unique hat which is designed to hypnotize people, thus allowing him to take complete control over their actions. He originally traveled across America as the manager, director, and ringmaster of his small traveling circus, which was actually a front for his "Circus of Crime"; The Human Cannonball, The Clown, Bruto the Strongman, The Great Gambonnos (acrobats and gymnasts) and Princess Python the Snake Charmer. During their show, he would hypnotize the crowd and send his lackeys out to steal any valuables on the victim's person. Once, while engaging in this activity, he managed to enslave the Hulk when he was under the control of Rick Jones who was attending a performance. However the Hulk captured him when he tried to escape in a chariot. Bringing this act to New York, he fought Spider-Man and Daredevil, whose blindness prevents Ringmaster from hypnotizing him, for the first time, though he was briefly able to place Spider-Man under his control. After this failure, he briefly abandoned the Circus of Crime, who became the Masters of Menace (a name Princess Python thought up) led by the Clown. He came back to steal their loot after their capture by Spider-Man, but was captured by the police instead along with the rest.

The Ringmaster next attempted to enlist recent Avengers inductees Hawkeye, Quicksilver, and Scarlet Witch as circus performers, but instead wound up defeated by them, though he claimed they tried to rob him making them wanted by the Police, though it is later claimed the DA got the truth out of Princess Python. He later schemed to blow up Avengers Mansion during the wedding of Yellowjacket and the Wasp and defeated Jarvis, but fought and was defeated by the Avengers. He later enlisted a mind-controlled Ulik as an accomplice, but was defeated by Thor. With Blackwing, he battled Daredevil once again. He also battled Power Man and Black Goliath. Ringmaster later helped Namor the Sub-Mariner and the Shroud secretly enter Latveria. He later captured the sea-nymph Meriam, and fought the Hulk again.

The Ringmaster later enlisted Howard the Duck as an unwilling accomplice, but was defeated by Howard and Iris Raritan. Ringmaster battled the Thing, Iceman, and Giant-Man. Ringmaster next pitted a mind-controlled Hulk against the Dragon Man. The Ringmaster was later hired by the Headmen to test She-Hulk's strength and invulnerability. He later attempted to reform, but helped the Circus of Crime escape from the police after battling Power Pack. He was released from prison in Doc Samson's custody, and assists in the therapy that creates the Merged Hulk personality for Bruce Banner when his MPD was causing him serious psychological damage.

The Ringmaster later gets a surgical-upgrade of his eyes, allowing him to use them to hypnotize people, from surgeons working for Devlin DeAngelo, which he used to hypnotize Bruce Banner. As "Martin Thraller", the Ringmaster used his hypnotic eyes while running for president of the United States (and manages to hypnotize Nick Fury into forgetting his own identity) until stopped by the Jack Truman incarnation of Deathlok.

The Ringmaster traveled to Tibet and stole a ring that had once been created for the Mandarin shortly before his apparent demise. Made from a piece of a shattered Cosmic Cube, the ring allows him to manipulate reality within a fifteen-foot radius. Attacking New York for 'practice', he clashes with various superheroes, including Spider-Man and Moon Knight. Moon Knight and Spider-Man are both given heart attacks, but then Daredevil joins the scene. Moments before the Ringmaster is about to fire them out of cannons, at the ground about one foot below, the Punisher shoots off his ring finger.

The Cosmic Ring is confiscated by Captain America, who encourages the grouping of heroes to get the shot-off finger to the ambulance personnel for reattachment. He later loses the ring when he is attacked by a M.O.D.O.C. squad. The ring is then found by Curtis Doyle, who uses it to become the superhero Freedom Ring until his death at the hands of Iron Maniac.

During the Civil War storyline, Ringmaster (alongside Clown and Great Gambonnos) was visible among an army of super-villains organized by Hammerhead that was captured by Iron Man and S.H.I.E.L.D. agents.

Later, Ringmaster enacts a plot to hypnotize the elderly into stealing for him, though this is foiled by Howard the Duck, and Talos the Untamed.

During the "Opening Salvo" part of the Secret Empire storyline, Ringmaster (along with the Circus of Crime) is recruited by Baron Zemo to join his Army of Evil.

Powers and abilities
The Ringmaster originally had no inherent superhuman powers.

The Ringmaster's principal weapon is the powerful portable mind-control device which he carried concealed in his unique top hat. This device is a portable version of the nullatron, which was originally designed by scientists in Nazi-occupied lands during World War II and used by the Red Skull against the Invaders in 1942. The version in the Ringmaster's hat has been specially modified by him for his own uses. The hat has a swirling disk in the front which can send out a hypnotic beam and give him control of the minds of others, amplifying his natural hypnotic talent. The disk can be used on its own as a handheld device that can be kept in a pocket as desired when the entire hat would otherwise be too obvious on occasion, and Tiboldt eventually had special hypnotic disks surgically grafted into his eyes. These implants allow him to mentally dominate individuals, but he still requires his hat to mesmerize large crowds of people simultaneously. Sufficiently strong-willed individuals are able to resist the Ringmaster's hypnotism if they cannot see the whirling pattern on his hat and the reflective stars on his costume. Others like Doc Samson have access to special glasses designed to neutralize the Ringmaster's technology.

With the Cosmic Ring, Tiboldt gained the ability to alter reality in a  radius around him.

In other media

Television
 The Ringmaster appears in the "Incredible Hulk" segment of The Marvel Super Heroes.
 The Ringmaster appears in the Spider-Man episode "Carnival of Crime", voiced by Stan Jones.
 The Ringmaster appears in the Avengers: United They Stand episode "Comes a Swordsman", voiced by Normand Bissonnette.
 The Ringmaster appears in The Super Hero Squad Show, voiced by Carlos Alazraqui. This version is a member of Doctor Doom's Lethal Legion.
 The Ringmaster appears in the Avengers Assemble episode "Crime and Circuses", voiced by Fred Tatasciore. This version wields flamethrower gloves in addition to his top hat and can vanish in a cloud of smoke.
 Maynard Tiboldt appears in the Jessica Jones episode "AKA Sole Survivor", portrayed by Ben Van Bergen. This version is a hypnotherapist who is hired by Trish Walker to evaluate Jessica Jones and try to unlock buried memories of her time as an IGH patient.

Video games
The Ringmaster appears in Questprobe featuring Spider-Man.

Miscellaneous
The Ringmaster appears in Marvel's Wastelanders: Hawkeye, voiced by Joe Morton.

References

External links
 Ringmaster (disambiguation) at Marvel.com

Characters created by Jack Kirby
Characters created by Stan Lee
Comics characters introduced in 1962
Fictional hypnotists and indoctrinators
Marvel Comics supervillains